The Julpe River is a river of Bolivia in the Cochabamba Department, Mizque Province, Mizque Municipality and in the Carrasco Province, Pocona Municipality. It is a left tributary of Mizque River. The confluence is north east of Mizque in the south of the Pocona Municipality.

See also
List of rivers of Bolivia

References

Rand McNally, The New International Atlas, 1993.

Rivers of Cochabamba Department